Empires & Allies is a strategy video game by Zynga. It was released on May 5, 2015 for Android and iOS. The game is a freemium game, meaning there was no cost to play but players had the option of purchasing premium content.

Gameplay
Empires and Allies is a single and multi player game, based on war strategy. The game is identical to the Disney multiplayer game Star Wars Commander which was released one year before Empires and Allies. In 2020 Zynga, the creators of Empires and Allies, acquired the rights to Star Wars Commander and promised the then large community of Star Wars Commander players improvements to the game and then cancelled it six months later.

Development

Reception

References

2015 video games
IOS games
Android (operating system) games
Social casual games
Video games developed in the United States
Zynga